Dormaa Central Municipal District is one of the twelve districts in Bono Region, Ghana. Originally it was formerly part of the then-larger Dormaa District on 10 March 1989; until the eastern part of the district was split off to create Dormaa East District on 1 November 2007 (effectively 29 February 2008); thus the remaining part has been retained as Dormaa District. However, on 28 Juan 2012, the southwest part of the district was split off to create Dormaa West District; while the remaining part was elevated to municipal district assembly status on that same year to become Dormaa Central Municipal District. The municipality is located in the southwest part of Bono Region and has Dormaa Ahenkro as its capital town.

List of settlements

Sources
 
 District: Dormaa Central Municipal District

References

Districts of Bono Region